Tyupkildy (Töpkilde) is a rural locality (a selo) in Sayranovsky Selsoviet, Tuymazinsky District, Bashkortostan, Russia. The population was 209 as of 2010. There are five streets.

Geography 
Tyupkildy is located 46 km southeast of Tuymazy (the district's administrative centre) by road. Urmekeyevo is the nearest rural locality.

References 

Rural localities in Tuymazinsky District